The 1947 TCU Horned Frogs football team was an American football team that represented Texas Christian University (TCU) in the Southwest Conference during the 1947 college football season. In its 14th season under head coach Dutch Meyer, the team compiled a 4–5–2 record (2–3–1 against conference opponents) and outscored opponents by a total of 114 to 99. TCU lost to Ole Miss by a score of 13–9 in the 1948 Delta Bowl. The team played its home games in Amon G. Carter Stadium, which is located on campus in Fort Worth, Texas.

Schedule

References

TCU
TCU Horned Frogs football seasons
TCU Horned Frogs football